The following is a complete list of episodes for the Geo reality series Pakistan Idol. The series debuted in Pakistan on 6 December 2013. The series entered into Pakistan after the successful adaptations of Idols format based on the British series by the name Pop Idol available in more than 45 nations.

Season 1: 2014

See also
 Pakistan Idol (season 1)
 List of Pakistan Idol finalists

References

External links
 
 
 Pakistan Idol on Dailymotion

Lists of Pakistani television series episodes
Episodes